Don't Be Afraid of the Dark is a 2010 supernatural horror film written by Guillermo del Toro and Matthew Robbins, and directed by Troy Nixey in his feature directorial debut. It is a remake of the 1973 ABC made-for-television film of the same name. The film stars Katie Holmes, Guy Pearce, and Bailee Madison, as a family moving into a 19th-century Rhode Island mansion, where the withdrawn daughter begins to witness malevolent creatures that emerge from a sealed ash pit in the basement of the house. Jack Thompson also stars in a supporting role.

An international co-production between the United States, Australia, and Mexico, it was filmed at the Drusilla Mansion in Mount Macedon and Melbourne (both in Victoria, Australia).

Don't Be Afraid of the Dark was released theatrically in the United States on August 26, 2011, by FilmDistrict. The film received mixed reviews from critics, who praised Holmes, Pearce and Madison's performances, direction, atmosphere and musical score, but criticized the lack of originality and jump scares. The film grossed $38.3 million against a $25 million budget.

Plot
At Blackwood Manor in Providence County, Rhode Island in the 19th century, renowned wildlife painter Lord Emerson Blackwood summons his housekeeper to the basement where he reluctantly bludgeons her to death. He removes her teeth, as well as his own, and offers them to mysterious creatures inside an ash pit within an old fireplace; the creatures reject his offer and demand only the teeth of children. Blackwood begs for them to give back his kidnapped son, only to be dragged in by the creatures.

In the present day, 8-year-old Sally Hurst arrives in Rhode Island to live with her father Alex and his girlfriend Kim; both are restoring Blackwood Manor to put it on the market for their client. Sally is depressed due to her mother forcefully putting her in Alex's care and giving her copious amounts of Adderall. The creatures are awakened by a tune from the nightlight. The next day, Sally hears the creatures calling her name and follows the voices to a sealed fireplace. "BE AFRAID" is written in runes above it.

She opens the fireplace and finds one of the old housekeeper's teeth. The creatures prove to be hostile, stealing Alex's razor and shredding Kim's clothes. Alex blames Sally and finds a 19th-century silver coin in her possession, which she found under her pillow after the tooth disappeared. Sally sneaks to the basement to talk with the creatures, but Mr. Harris, one of the workers, sends her away and tries to seal the fireplace. The creatures brutally attack him and he is hospitalized.

Kim visits Harris in the hospital, who tells her to find the unpublished artwork of Lord Blackwood in the local library. The artwork is of a creature the librarian describes as being like tooth fairies, which sometimes turn a human into one of their own. Sally is attacked again by the creatures, the leader being a transformed Lord Blackwood. Kim finds an undiscovered mural painted by Blackwood, depicting his son being taken by the creatures. Sally is trapped in the library by the creatures, but fends them off using her camera flash since they are afraid of the light. She also manages to kill one of them.

Alex and Kim try to flee the house with Sally but they are all ambushed by the creatures and knocked out. When Sally wakes up, her feet have been tied, and the creatures are starting to drag her to the basement for her transformation. Kim awakens and frees Sally, only to get caught herself in the ropes and break both her legs in a gruesome manner. The creatures drag Kim into the fireplace, as a distraught Sally crushes the creature who used to be Lord Blackwood to death. Alex and Sally mourn Kim's loss.

Some time later, both return to the abandoned mansion to leave a drawing of Kim there. After they leave, a draft blows the drawing into the creatures' lair; the entrance is now bolted with metal. Kim has now been transformed. As the creatures plan to come out, Kim convinces them to stay in hiding because they "have all the time in the world" and others will come to the manor.

Cast
 Bailee Madison as Sally Hurst
 Katie Holmes as Kim Raphael
 Guy Pearce as Alex Hurst
 Jack Thompson as William Harris
 Alan Dale as Charles Jacoby
 Trudy Hellier as Evelyn Jacoby
 Julia Blake as Mrs. Underhill
 Garry McDonald as Emerson Blackwood
 Nicholas Bell as Psychiatrist
 James Mackay as Librarian
 Emelia Burns as Caterer
 Grant Piro, Dylan Young, Guillermo del Toro, Todd Macdonald, and Angus Smallwood (creature voices)

Production
Co-writer and producer Guillermo del Toro chose comic-book artist Troy Nixey to direct the film, after seeing Nixey's short film Latchkey's Lament (2007) . For the design of the creatures in the film, Nixey drew inspiration from pictures of mole rats.

Del Toro has attributed the idea of giving the creatures in the film a fairy origin to the work of the writer Arthur Machen, saying in an interview: "I love the Welsh author Arthur Machen and his idea that fairy lore comes from a dark place, that it’s derived from little, pre-human creatures who are really, really nasty vermin but are magical in a way, living as they do for hundreds of years. His books are what compelled me to do this." Machen's stories are specifically mentioned in the film by the librarian character. Del Toro is also a long-standing admirer of Machen and said his work was also an influence on Pan's Labyrinth (2006) and Hellboy II: The Golden Army (2008), both of which also feature fairy creatures.

The name of "Emerson Blackwood", the character who built the mansion in the film, is a tribute to Algernon Blackwood, another writer of supernatural horror stories.

Release
This picture, which was developed with Miramax in the wake of the division's closure and sale, was released by FilmDistrict, and was rated R despite filmmaker ambitions to the contrary. Del Toro has stated, "We originally thought we could shoot it as PG-13 without compromising the scares ... And then the MPAA came back and gave us a badge of honor. They gave us an R for 'Violence and Terror.' We asked them if there was anything we could do, and they said, 'Why ruin a perfectly scary movie?'"

The initial release date was scheduled for January 21, 2011, but due to the sale of Miramax by the Walt Disney Company on December 2010, the release was put on hold until the sale was finalized. The film was eventually released on August 26, 2011. Additionally, Nixey narrated the film at a screening at the 2010 San Diego Comic-Con International.

It was released on DVD and Blu-ray on January 3, 2012 in the US by Sony Pictures Home Entertainment and February 20, 2012 in the UK by StudioCanal.

Reception
On Rotten Tomatoes, the film has an approval rating of 60% based on reviews from 177 critics, with an average rating of 5.9/10. The website's critical consensus states that "While it's pleasantly atmospheric and initially quite scary, Don't Be Afraid of the Dark ultimately fails to deliver the skin-crawling chills of the original". On Metacritic, it has a weighted average score 56 out of 100 based on reviews from 35 critics, indicating "mixed or average reviews".

Roger Ebert of the Chicago Sun-Times gave the film 3½ stars out of 4, calling it "a very good haunted house film" and adding that it "milks our frustration deliciously."

References

External links
 
 
 

2010 films
2010 horror films
2010s monster movies
American monster movies
Mexican fantasy films
Mexican horror films
Gothic horror films
Films set in country houses
Films set in Rhode Island
Films with screenplays by Guillermo del Toro
Films with screenplays by Matthew Robbins
2010s English-language films
Films produced by Guillermo del Toro
Remakes of American films
Horror film remakes
Films scored by Marco Beltrami
Films shot in Melbourne
2010s American films
2010s Mexican films
Films about tooth fairies